Takmakkaran (Tuqmaqqaran) is a rural locality (a village) in Ziriklinsky Selsoviet, Bizhbulyaksky District, Bashkortostan, Russia. The population was 47 as of 2010. There is 1 street.

Geography 
Takmakkaran is located 20 km southwest of Bizhbulyak (the district's administrative centre) by road. Maly Sedyak is the nearest rural locality.

References 

Rural localities in Bizhbulyaksky District